Robbie Ryan may refer to:

 Robbie Ryan (footballer) (born 1977), Irish footballer
 Robbie Ryan (cinematographer) (born 1970), Irish cinematographer

See also 
 Robert Ryan (disambiguation)